This list of the prehistoric life of South Carolina contains the various prehistoric life-forms whose fossilized remains have been reported from within the US state of South Carolina.

Precambrian
The Paleobiology Database records no known occurrences of Precambrian fossils in Alabama.

Paleozoic
 †Agraulos
 †Hypagnostus
 †Hypagnostus mammillatus
 †Paradoxides
 †Paradoxides polonicus – or unidentified comparable form
 †Peronopsis
 †Peronopsis fallax
  †Ptychagnostus
 †Ptychagnostus fissus
 †Skreiaspis

Mesozoic

  †Acteon
 †Acutostrea
 †Acutostrea plumosa
 †Aenona
 †Aenona eufaulensis
 †Amaurellina
 †Amaurellina stephensoni
 †Ambigostrea
 †Ambigostrea sloani
 †Ambigostrea tecticosta
  †Anomia
 †Anomia argentaria
 †Anomia ornata
 †Anomoeodus
 †Anomoeodus phaseolus
 †Aphrodina
 †Aphrodina tippana
 †Arca
 †Archaeolamna
 †Archaeolamna kopingensis
 Ataphrus
  †Baculites
 †Bellifusus
 †Bellifusus crassicostatus
 †Bellifusus curvicostatus
 †Borodinopristis
 †Borodinopristis schwimmeri
 Botula
 †Botula carolinensis
 †Brachyrhizodus
 †Brachyrhizodus wichitaensis
 Caestocorbula
 †Caestocorbula crassaplica
 †Caestocorbula crassiplica
 †Caestocorbula terramaria
 †Calliomphalus
 †Calliomphalus americanus
 †Calliomphalus nudus
  Calyptraea
 †Camptonectes
 †Camptonectes argillensis
 †Camptonectes bubonis
 †Cantioscyllium
 †Cantioscyllium meyeri
  Carcharias
 †Carcharias holmdelensis
 †Carcharias samhammeri
 Chiloscyllium
 Cliona
 †Clisocolus
 †Clisocolus concentricum
  Corbula
 Crassatella
 †Crassatella carolinana
 †Crassatella vadosa
 †Crenella
 †Crenella elegantula
 †Crenella serica
  †Cretalamna
 †Cretalamna appendiculata
 †Cretodus
 †Cretodus borodini
  Cucullaea
 †Cucullaea capax
 †Cucullaea littlei
 †Cucullaea powersi
 †Cuna
 †Cuna texana
 †Cuspidaria
 †Cuspidaria ampulla
 †Cyclorisma
 †Cyclorisma parva
 Cylichna
 †Cymbophora
 †Cymbophora appressa
 †Cymbophora berryi
 †Cymbophora trigonalis
 †Cyprimeria
 †Cyprimeria alta
 †Cyprimeria depressa
 †Cyprimeria major
  †Dentalium
 †Dentalium leve
 †Dentalium navarroi
 †Deussenia
 †Deussenia bellalirata
 †Dhondtichlamys
 †Dhondtichlamys venustus
 †Drilluta
 †Drilluta buboanus
 †Ellipsoscapha
  †Enchodus
 †Enchodus petrosus
 †Etea
 †Eulima
 †Euspira
 †Euspira rectilabrum
  †Exogyra
 †Exogyra costata
 †Flemingostrea
 †Gegania
 Glossus
  Glycymeris
 †Glycymeris rotundata
 †Graciliala
 †Granocardium
 †Granocardium bowenae
 †Granocardium kuemmeli
 †Granocardium kummeli
 †Granocardium lowei
 †Granocardium trilineatum – or unidentified comparable form
 Gyrodes
 †Gyrodes spillmani
 †Gyrodes supraplicatus
 †Hamulus
 †Hamulus huntensis – tentative report
 †Hamulus onyx
 †Hamulus squamosus
 †Harduinia
 †Harduinia mortonis
 †Helicaulax
 †Helicaulax formosa
 †Hercorhynchus
  Heterodontus
 †Heterodontus granti – or unidentified related form
 †Holkopollenites
 †Holkopollenites forix
 †Homomya
 †Homomya thrusheri – tentative report
  †Hybodus
 †Hypolophus
 †Hypolophus mcnultyi
  †Inoceramus
 †Ischyrhiza
 †Ischyrhiza avonicola
 †Ischyrhiza mira
 Juliacorbula
 †Juliacorbula monmouthensis
 Laternula
 †Latiala
 †Latiala lobata – or unidentified comparable form
 †Laxispira
 †Laxispira monilifera
 †Leptosolen
 †Leptosolen biplicata
 Lima
 †Lima pelagica
 Limatula
 †Limatula acutilineata
 Limopsis
 †Linearis
 †Linearis magnoliensis
 †Linearis metastriata
 †Liopeplum
 †Liopeplum cretaceum
 †Liopeplum leinodosum
 †Liopistha
 †Liopistha protexta
 †Liothyris – tentative report
  †Lissodus
 †Lissodus babulskii
  Lithophaga
  Lopha
 †Lopha falcata
 †Lycettia
 †Lycettia tippana
 †Lycettia tippanus
 †Margaritella
 †Margaritella pumila – or unidentified comparable form
 †Mathilda
 †Medionapus
 †Micrabacia
  †Modiolus
 †Modiolus sedesclaris
 †Modiolus sedesclarus
 †Modiolus trigonus
 †Morea
 †Morea cancellaria
  †Mosasaurus
 Myrtea
 †Myrtea stephensoni
 †Nemodon
 †Nemodon eufalensis
 †Nemodon eufaulensis
 †Nonactaeonina
 Nucula
 †Nucula cuneifrons
 †Nucula percrassa
 Nuculana
 †Nuculana whitfieldi
 †Nymphalucina
 †Nymphalucina linearia
 †Ornopsis – tentative report
 Ostrea
  †Pachyrhizodus – or unidentified comparable form
 †Paladmete
 †Paladmete cancellaria
 †Paralbula
 †Paralbula casei
 †Pararhincodon
 †Parmicorbula
 †Parmicorbula terramaria
 †Periplomya
 †Pleuriocardia
 †Pleuriocardia eufaulense
  Polinices
 †Postligata
 †Postligata wordeni
 †Protocardia
 †Protocardia spillmani
 †Pseudolimea
 †Pseudolimea reticulata
 Pseudomalaxis
 †Pseudomalaxis pilsbryi
  †Pteria
 †Pterocerella
 †Pterotrigonia
 †Pterotrigonia cerulea
 †Pterotrigonia eufalensis
 †Pterotrigonia eufaulensis
 †Ptychotrygon
 †Ptychotrygon vermiculata
 Pycnodonte
 †Pycnodonte vesicularis
 †Pyrifusus
 †Remera
 Rhinobatos
 †Rhinobatos casieri
  †Rhombodus
 †Rhombodus binkhorsti
 †Rhombodus laevis
 Ringicula
 †Ringicula clarki
 †Sargana
 †Sargana stantoni
 †Schizorhiza
 †Schizorhiza stromeri
 Serpula
 Solemya
 †Solyma
 †Solyma elliptica – or unidentified related form
  †Sphenodiscus
  Squalicorax
 †Squalicorax kaupi
 †Squalicorax pristodontus
 Squatina
 †Squatina hassei
 †Stantonella
 †Stephanodus – report made of unidentified related form or using admittedly obsolete nomenclature
 Striarca
 †Striarca saffordi
 †Syncyclonema
 †Syncyclonema simplicius
 Tellina
 †Tellinimera
 †Tellinimera buboana
 †Tellinimera gabbi
 †Trachybaculites
 †Trachybaculites columna
  Trachycardium
 †Trachycardium eufaulensis
  Turritella
 †Turritella bilira
 †Turritella penderensis
 †Turritella pointensis
 †Turritella tippana
 †Turritella trilira
 †Turritella vertebroides
 †Uddenia
 †Unicardium
 †Unicardium concentricum
 †Veniella
 †Veniella conradi
 †Vetericardiella
 †Vetericardiella crenalirata

Cenozoic

Selected Cenozoic taxa of South Carolina

 †Abra
 Acanthocardia
  Acteocina
  Acteon
 †Adeorbis
 †Adocus
 Aequipecten
 Agaronia
 Agassizia
 †Aglyptorhynchus
 †Agorophius
 Alligator
  †Alligator mississippiensis
 Alopias
  †Alopias vulpinus – or unidentified comparable form
 †Altrix
 †Amalthea
 Ammonia
 Amphistegina
 Amusium
 Anachis
 Anadara
  †Anadara brasiliana
 †Anadara ovalis
 †Anadara transversa
 Anatina
   Ancilla
 Angaria – report made of unidentified related form or using admittedly obsolete nomenclature
 Angulus
 Anomia
 †Anomia simplex
 Antalis
 Antigona
 Arbacia
 Arca
 †Arca imbricata
 Architectonica
 Arcinella
 †Arcinella arcinella
 †Arcinella cornuta
  †Arctodus
 †Arctodus pristinus
 Argopecten
 †Argopecten gibbus
  †Argopecten irradians
 Argyrotheca
 Artena
 Astarte
 Astyris
 †Astyris lunata
 Athleta
  Atrina
 †Atrina rigida
 †Atrina seminuda
 †Atrina serrata
  †Aturia
 Aulacomya
 Balaenoptera
 Balanophyllia
 Balanus
 Barbatia
 Barnea
  †Basilosaurus
 Bison
  †Bison antiquus
 †Bonellitia
 Boonea
 †Boonea seminuda
  †Borophagus
 †Borophagus hilli – or unidentified comparable form
 Borsonia
 Bostrycapulus
 †Bostrycapulus aculeatus
 †Bottosaurus
 †Braarudosphaera bigelowii
 Brachidontes
 †Brachidontes exustus
 Buccella
 Bullia
  Busycon
 †Busycon carica
 †Busycon contrarium
 †Busycon perversum
 Busycotypus
 †Busycotypus canaliculatus
 †Bythaelurus
 Cadulus
 Caecum
 †Caecum cooperi
 †Caecum imbricatum
 Caestocorbula
 Calliostoma
 Callista
 Calotrophon
 †Calotrophon ostrearum
 Calyptraea
 †Calyptraea centralis
 Cancellaria
 †Cancellaria reticulata
 Canis
  †Canis armbrusteri
  †Canis dirus
 Carcharhinus
 Carcharias
 Carcharodon
 †Carcharodon hastalis
 Cardita
 Carditamera
 †Carolinacetus – type locality for genus
 Cassidulina
 Castor
 †Castor canadensis
  †Castoroides
 †Castoroides leiseyorum
 †Castoroides ohioensis – or unidentified comparable form
 Cerithiella – tentative report
 Cerithiopsis
 †Cerithiopsis emersonii
 Cerithium – tentative report
 †Cervalces
  †Cervalces scotti
 Cervus
 †Cervus elaphus
 Chama
 †Chama congregata
 Cheilea
 Chelydra
  †Chelydra serpentina
 †Chesapecten
 †Chesapecten jeffersonius
 Chicoreus
 Chione
 †Chione cancellata
 Chlamys
  †Choneziphius
 Chrysemys
 †Chrysemys floridana
 †Chrysocetus – type locality for genus
 Cibicides
 Cidaris
 Cinctura
 †Cinctura lilium
 Cirsotrema
  Cladocora
 Clavilithes
 Clavus
 Cliona
 Closia
 Coccolithus
 Cochlespira
 Cochliolepis
  Coelopleurus
 Coluber – or unidentified comparable form
 Columbellopsis
 Concavus
 Conomitra
 Conus
 †Conus delessertii
 †Conus jaspideus
 Coralliophila
 Corbicula
  Corbula
 †Coronodon – type locality for genus
 †Cotylocara – type locality for genus
 †Coupatezia
 †Crassinella lunulata
 Crassostrea
 †Crassostrea virginica
 Crepidula
 †Crepidula convexa
 †Crepidula fornicata
 †Crepidula plana
  †Cretolamna
 †Cretolamna appendiculata
 Crucibulum
 Cryptonatica
 Cucullaea
 Cumingia
  †Cuvieronius
 Cyclocardia
 Cylichna
 Cymbovula
 †Cymbovula acicularis
 Cypraea
 Cythara
 Cytherea
 Daphnella
 Dasyatis
 Dasypus
  †Dasypus bellus
 Dendraster
 Dentalium
 Dentimargo
 †Dentimargo aureocinctus
 Dinocardium
 †Dinocardium robustum
 Diodon
 Diodora
  †Diodora cayenensis
 †Diplodonta punctata
 †Diplodonta semiaspera
 Discinisca
 †Discoaster
 Discorbis
 Donax
 †Donax fossor
 †Donax variabilis
  †Dorudon – type locality for genus
 †Dorudon serratus – type locality for species
 Dosinia
 Echinocardium
 †Echovenator – type locality for genus
 †Ecphora
 Elaphe – or unidentified comparable form
 Elphidium
  Ensis
 †Ensis directus
 †Ensis minor
 †Eomysticetus – type locality for genus
 †Eosurcula
 Epitonium
 †Epitonium humphreysii
 Equus
  †Eremotherium
 †Eremotherium laurillardi
 Erethizon
 †Erethizon dorsatum
 Erignathus
 †Erignathus barbatus
 Ervilia
 Erycina
 †Eucrassatella speciosa
 Eupleura
 †Eupleura caudata
  Euspira
 †Euspira heros
 †Eutrephoceras
 Evalea
 Fasciolaria
 †Fasciolaria tulipa
 †Ficopsis
  Ficus
 Finella
 †Finella dubia
 Flabellum
 Fusinus
 Galeocerdo
 †Galeocerdo aduncus
 †Galeocerdo cuvier
 Galeodea
 Galeorhinus
 Gari
 Gastrochaena
  †Gavialosuchus
 †Gavialosuchus americanus
 Gegania
 Gemma
 Gemophos
 †Gemophos tinctus
 Geochelone
  †Georgiacetus
 †Georgiacetus vogtlensis – or unidentified comparable form
 †Gigantostrea
 Ginglymostoma
 Globigerina
 Globulina
 Glossus
 Glycymeris
 †Glycymeris americana
 †Glycymeris decussata
 Glyptoactis
  †Glyptotherium
 Gopherus
 Gymnura
 Halichoerus – or unidentified comparable form
 †Halichoerus grypus
  †Halitherium
 †Halitherium alleni – type locality for species
 Hastula – report made of unidentified related form or using admittedly obsolete nomenclature
 Haustator
 †Hemiauchenia
 †Hemiauchenia macrocephala
 Hemipristis
 †Hemipristis serra
 Here
 Hexaplex
 Hiatella
  †Holmesina
 Horologica
 Hyotissa
 †Hyposaurus
 Ilyanassa
 †Ilyanassa obsoleta
 †Ilyanassa trivittata
 Infundibulum
 †Ischyodus
 †Isocrania
 Isognomon
 Kinosternon
 Kurtziella
 †Kurtziella cerina
 Laevicardium
 †Laevicardium mortoni
  Lamna
 Latirus – tentative report
 Lima
 Limaria
 Limatula
 Linga
 †Linthia
  Liotia
 Lithophaga
 Littoraria
 †Littoraria irrorata
  Lucina
 †Lucina pensylvanica
 Lunularia
 Lynx
 †Lynx rufus
 Lyria
 Macoma
 †Macoma balthica
 †Macoma tenta
 Macrocallista
 †Macrocallista maculata
 †Macrocallista nimbosa
 Mactra
 Malaclemys
 †Malaclemys terrapin
 †Mammut
  †Mammut americanum
 †Mammuthus
  †Mammuthus columbi – or unidentified comparable form
 Manta
 †Manta fragilis
 Maretia
 Marginella
 Martesia
 †Mathilda
 †Mauricia
  †Megalonyx
 †Megalonyx jeffersonii
 Meiocardia
 Melampus
 †Melampus bidentatus
 Melanella
 †Melanella conoidea
 Menippe – tentative report
 Mercenaria
 †Mercenaria mercenaria
 Mesalia
 Mesodesma
  †Metaxytherium
 Metis – tentative report
 Microdrillia
  †Miracinonyx
 †Miracinonyx inexpectatus
 Mitrella
 Mobula
 Modiolus
 Mulinia
 †Mulinia lateralis
 Murex
 Murexiella
 †Murexiella glypta
 †Murexiella macgintyi
 †Mya
 †Mya arenaria
 Myliobatis
  †Mylohyus
 †Mylohyus fossilis – or unidentified comparable form
 Mytilus
 †Nanosiren – tentative report
  Nassarius
 †Nassarius acutus
 †Nassarius vibex
 Natica
 Naticarius
 Nebrius
 †Neochoerus
 †Neochoerus aesopi
 †Neochoerus pinckneyi
  Neofiber
 †Neofiber alleni
 Neomonachus
  †Neomonachus tropicalis
 Neverita
 Nodipecten
 Nucula
 †Nucula proxima
 †Nuculana acuta
 Oculina
 Odobenus
  †Odobenus rosmarus
 Odocoileus
  †Odocoileus virginianus
 Odostomia
 †Odostomia pedroana – or unidentified comparable form
 Oliva
 †Oliva sayana
 Olivella
 †Olivella mutica
 †Ontocetus
 †Ontocetus emmonsi
 †Ophiomorpha
 †Osteopygis
 Ostrea
 †Otodus
  †Otodus megalodon
 †Oxyrhina
 †Pachecoa
 †Pachyarmatherium
 †Pachyarmatherium leiseyi
 †Palaeochenoides – tentative report
 †Palaeochenoides mioceanus
 †Palaeolama
 †Palaeophis
 Pandora
 Panopea
 Panthera
 †Panthera leo
 †Panthera onca
  †Paramylodon
 †Paramylodon harlani – or unidentified comparable form
 Parvanachis
 †Parvanachis obesa
 Pecten
  †Pelagornis
 †Pelagornis sandersi – type locality for species
 Penion
 Petaloconchus
 Petricola
 †Petricola pholadiformis
 Phalium
 Phoca
 Pholadomya
 Pholas
 Phos
 Phyllonotus
 †Phyllonotus pomum
 Physa
  Physeter
 †Physogaleus
 Pinna
  Pitar
 †Pitar morrhuanus
 Placopecten
 Planorbis
 Pleuromeris
 †Pleuromeris tridentata
 Pleurotomaria
 Plicatula
 †Plicatula gibbosa
 Polinices
 Polymesoda
 †Polymesoda caroliniana
 †Prionodon
  Pristis
 †Procolpochelys
 Procyon
 †Procyon lotor
 †Protosiren
 Prunum
 †Prunum roscidum
 Psammechinus
  †Psephophorus
 Pseudochama
 Pseudoliva
 Pseudorca
 †Pseudorca crassidens
 Pteria
 †Pteria colymbus
 Pteromeris
 †Pteromeris perplana
  †Puma
 †Puma concolor
 Puncturella
 Pusula
 †Pusula pediculus
 Pycnodonte
 Pyramidella
 Pyrgo
 †Quadrans
 Quinqueloculina
 Raja
 Rangia
 Rangifer
  †Rangifer tarandus – or unidentified comparable form
 Ranina
 Raphitoma
 Retusa
  Rhincodon
 †Rhincodon typus – or unidentified comparable form
 Rhinobatos
 Rhinoptera
 †Rhinoptera bonasus – or unidentified comparable form
 Rhizoprionodon
 Rhynchobatus
 Rosalina
 Rostellaria – report made of unidentified related form or using admittedly obsolete nomenclature
 Sassia
 Sayella
 †Sayella fusca
 Scapharca
  Scaphella
 Schizoporella
 †Schizoporella unicornis
 Sconsia
 Scyliorhinus – tentative report
 Seila
 †Seila adamsii
 Semele
 Serpulorbis
 Sigatica
 †Sigatica carolinensis
  Sigmodon
 Sinum
 †Sinum perspectivum
  †Smilodon
 †Smilodon fatalis
 Solariella
 Solemya
 Solen
 †Solen ensis
 Solenosteira
 †Solenosteira cancellaria
 †Spatangus
 Sphyrna
 †Sphyrna media – or unidentified comparable form
 †Sphyrna zygaena
 Spisula
 Spondylus
  †Squalodon
 Squatina
 Stewartia
 Strioterebrum
 Strombus
 †Strombus pugilis
 Subcancilla
 Sveltella
 Sveltia
 †Syllomus
 Sylvilagus
 Tagelus
  Tapirus
 †Tapirus veroensis
 Tectonatica
 †Tectonatica pusilla
 Teinostoma
 Tellina
 Tenagodus
 Terebra
 †Terebra protexta
 †Teredina
 Teredo
 Terrapene
 †Terrapene carolina
 Textularia
  †Thecachampsa
  †Thoracosaurus
 Thracia
 Timoclea
 Trachycardium
 †Trachycardium egmontianum
 †Trachycardium muricatum
 Tremarctos
 †Tremarctos floridanus
 Triakis – tentative report
  Trichechus
 Trigonostoma
 †Trinacria
 Triplofusus
 †Triplofusus giganteus
 Trivia
 Trochita
 Trochus
 †Tuba
  Tucetona
 Turbo – report made of unidentified related form or using admittedly obsolete nomenclature
 Turbonilla
 †Turbonilla aragoni – or unidentified comparable form
 †Turbonilla interrupta
 Turricula
 Turris
 Turritella
 Tursiops
  †Tursiops truncatus – or unidentified comparable form
 †Tusciziphius
 †Tympanonesiotes – type locality for genus
 †Tympanonesiotes wetmorei – type locality for species
 Typhis
 Urocyon
  †Urocyon cinereoargenteus – or unidentified comparable form
 Urosalpinx
 †Urosalpinx cinerea
 Venericardia
 Vermicularia
 †Vermicularia fargoi
 †Vermicularia spirata
 Verticordia
 Vexillum
 †Vexillum wandoense
  Vitis
 Voluta
 Volutifusus
 Xenophora
 †Xenophora conchyliophora
 †Xenorophus – type locality for genus
 †Xiphiorhynchus
 †Xylotrypa
 Yoldia
  †Yoldia limatula

References
 

South Carolina